Shadows is a 1953 Soviet drama film directed by Nikolay Akimov and Nadezhda Kosheverova and starring Valentin Lebedev,  Vladimir Petrov and Galina Korotkevich. On the eponymous play by Saltykov-Shchedrin.

Plot
In the 1860s, from the province of St. Petersburg comes the liberal-minded young officer Bobyrev. He hopes under the protection of his schoolmate Klaverova, who became a general, to make a career. Gen. happily defines Bobyrev in his office, and already builds plans, both through the beautiful Sophia, wife Bobyrev will wage a successful struggle with opponents and influence voluptuous Minister Tarakanov.

Cast
 Valentin Lebedev  as Pyotr Sergeich Klaverov  
 Vladimir Petrov as Nikolay Dmitrich Bobyrev  
 Galina Korotkevich as Sofya Aleksandrovna  
 Vera Budreyko as Olga Dmitriyevna  
 Yuri Bublikov as Pavel Nikolaich Naboykin  
 Anatoli Abramov as Ivan Mikheich Svistikov  
 Aleksandr Gyultsen as Young Tarakanov 
 Ovsey Kagan as Savva Semyonych Obtyazhnov  
 Dmitry Bessonov as Kamarzhintsev  
 Evgeniy Gvozdev as Narukavnikov  
 Vladimir Taskin as Tarakanov 
 Aleksandr Estrin as Hairdresser  
 Aleksey Rozanov as Courier  
 Berta Vinogradova as Klara

References

Bibliography 
 Natalja Čemodanova & Alfred Krautz. International Directory of Cinematographers, Set-And Costume Designers in Film: Soviet Union. Saur, 1995.

External links 
 

1953 films
1953 drama films
Soviet drama films
1950s Russian-language films
Lenfilm films
Soviet films based on plays
Films directed by Nadezhda Kosheverova